Dhaka South City Corporation (DSCC) is one of the two municipal corporations in Dhaka created when the former Dhaka City Corporation (first declared in 1864) was divided into two by the Local Government (City Corporation) Amendment Bill 2011 on 29 November 2011, passed in the Parliament of Bangladesh, following the President's approval. Dhaka South has a long history, including that of European arrival and colonization.  The area was initially 45 km2, but expanded in 2017 to 109.2 km2 and Bangladesh Bureau of Statistics (BBS) published Population and Housing Census 2022 count at 4,299,345, giving the city a density of 39,371 people per km2.

Dhaka South was the center of the events which eventually led to the Bangladesh Liberation War.

History
The Local Government (City Corporation) Amendment Act 2011 divided Dhaka City Corporation into Dhaka South City Corporation (DSCC) and Dhaka North City Corporation (DNCC) on 29 November 2011. The government appointed Md. Khalilur Rahman (additional Secretary) as the administrator of DSCC.

According to the existing law, the executive power of the Dhaka South City Corporation vests in and is exercised by the mayor/administrator. The Corporation constitutes several standing committees and other committees to monitor and guide the diversified activities of the organization. The mayor/administrator is assisted by the chief executive officer, who in turn, is assisted by the secretary, the heads of departments and zonal executive officers.

Administration
Dhaka South City Corporation consists of 75 wards covering the thanas of Paltan, Motijheel, Sabujbagh, Khilgaon, Mugda, Shahjahanpur, Shampur, Jatrabari, Demra, Kadamtali, Gandaria, Wari, Ramna, Shahbag, Dhanmondi, Hazaribagh, Kalabgan, Kotwali, Sutrapur, Lalbagh, Bangsal, Chawkbazar, and Kamrangirchar.

Services 
Dhaka South City Corporation is responsible for administering and providing basic infrastructure to the city.
 Evict illegal installations.
 Purify and supply water.
 Treat and dispose of contaminated water and sewage.
 Eliminate waterlogging.
 Garbage removal and street cleaning.
 To manage solid waste.
 To arrange hospital and dispensary.
 Construction and maintenance of roads.
 Installation of electric street lights.
 Establish car parking.
 Maintenance parks and playground.
 Maintenance of cemeteries and crematoriums.
 Preparation of birth and death registration certificate.
 Preserving the traditional place.
 Disease control, immunization.
 Establishment of city corporation schools and colleges.

List of Mayors 

The Mayor of the South Dhaka is the chief executive of the Dhaka South City Corporation. The Mayor's office administers all city services, public property, most public agencies, and enforces all city and state laws within Dhaka city.

According to the existing law, the executive power of the Dhaka South City Corporation vests in and is exercised by the mayor/administrator. The Corporation constitutes several standing committees and other committees to monitor and guide the diversified activities of the organization. The mayor/administrator is assisted by the chief executive officer, who in turn, is assisted by the secretary, the heads of departments and zonal executive officers.

Elections

Election result 2020

Election result 2015

See also
 Upazilas of Bangladesh
 Districts of Bangladesh
 Divisions of Bangladesh

References

External links
 Official website

City Corporations of Bangladesh
Government of Dhaka